Modern Lullaby is an album by the Canadian band Martha and the Muffins, released in 1992. Although released under the band's original name, only Martha Johnson and Mark Gane remained following the original band's breakup.

No singles were released from the album, though the track "Rainbow Sign" was promoted to radio, and videos were produced for "Rainbow Sign", "Everybody Has A Place" and "Fighting the Monster". The album was a commercial disappointment.

Critical reception

The Edmonton Journal wrote: "Dusting their lean, insistent beat and Johnson's unadorned drama with sweet swirls of violin, this outfit proves that there were, and still are, poetic ways to make commercial dance music."

Track listing

Personnel
Martha Johnson - guitar, keyboards, vocals
Mark Gane - guitar, keyboards, vocals
David Piltch - bass
Stuart Gordon - violin
Michael Sloski - percussion
Tim Gane - percussion

Recording
Recorded at The Web in Bath, England and Toronto, Canada (1988-1991)
Mixed at Winfield Sound, Toronto
Mixing Engineer - Earl Torno, assisted by Eric Apps
Mastered by Peter J. Moore

References

Martha and the Muffins albums
1992 albums